CKGC-FM is an 80s Hits formatted broadcast radio station.  The station is licensed to Iqaluit, Nunavut and serves Iqaluit and Apex in Nunavut.  CKGC-FM is owned and operated by Northern Lights Entertainment, Inc.

References

External links
 103.5 Capital FM Online
 CKGC-FM History - Canadian Communications Foundation
 

2011 establishments in Nunavut
Radio stations established in 2011
KGC
KGC